Elections to Stoke-on-Trent City Council took place on 6 May 2010, coinciding with the national General election.  One third - 20 seats - of the council were up for election.

Election result
After the election, the parties were represented thus: Labour 27 seats; Conservative 8 seats; British National Party 5 seats; Liberal Democrat 5 seats; Others 15 seats. Although Labour had greatly improved its position, becoming the largest party, the council remained in no overall control.

|- style="background-color:#F6F6F6"
| colspan="7" style="text-align: right; margin-right: 0.5em" | Turnout
| style="text-align: right; margin-right: 0.5em" | 30.2
| style="text-align: right; margin-right: 0.5em" | 55,988
| style="text-align: right; margin-right: 0.5em" |
|-

Ward results

			

			

			

			

			

			

			

			

			

			

			

			

			

			

			

			

2010 English local elections
May 2010 events in the United Kingdom
2010
2010s in Staffordshire